"Options" is a song recorded by American singer Luke James featuring American rapper Rick Ross. It was released on June 3, 2014, as the first single from James' self-titled debut studio album, Luke James (2014). The song was written by Dominic Gordon, Brandon Hesson, Jamaica "Kahn-Cept" Smith and Rick Ross, while the production was helmed by The Alliance. James' solo version of "Options" was nominated for a Grammy Award for Best R&B Song.

Music video
The music video for "Options" featuring Rick Ross premiered on June 27, 2014, via James' Vevo channel. It was directed by Yolande Geralds.

Charts

Awards and nominations

References

External links

2014 singles
2014 songs
Rick Ross songs
Island Records singles
Songs written by Rick Ross